George "Dod" Burrell (21 January 1921 – 28 July 2001) was a Scotland international rugby union player. He later became an international referee and president of the Scottish Rugby Union.

Rugby Union career

Amateur career

He played club rugby for Gala.

During the war he played for the 6th Battalion of the King's Own Scottish Borderers, his army side. He captained the squad and they won the British Army championship title.

Provincial career

He played for South of Scotland District.

International career

Burrell was capped four times as a fullback for Scotland between 1950 and 1951.

Referee career

On retiring from playing he took up refereeing and refereed two international matches – one each in the 1958 Five Nations Championship and 1959 Five Nations Championship.

Administrative career

He was assistant manager of the 1970 Scotland tour to Australia and took over as manager when Hector Monro had to return to Britain to fight a General Electio

Burrell also managed the 1975 Scotland rugby union tour of New Zealand and the 1977 British Lions tour to New Zealand

Burrell joined the SRU committee and served from 1968 to 86.

He was President of the Scottish Rugby Union in 1985–86.

Military career

He served with the King's Own Scottish Borderers during the war. He was wounded in Normandy in 1944.

He was a company sergeant in the mortar platoon.

Death

He died at the Borders General Hospital in Melrose.

References

1921 births
2001 deaths
Rugby union players from Galashiels
Scottish rugby union players
Rugby union fullbacks
Scottish rugby union referees
Scotland international rugby union players
Scottish sports executives and administrators
Presidents of the Scottish Rugby Union
20th-century Scottish businesspeople